"A Warrior's Call" is a song by Danish rock band Volbeat and the ninth track from their fourth studio album, Beyond Hell/Above Heaven. It is dedicated to former professional boxer Mikkel Kessler who provides vocals on the track. It was released in 2011 as a single to active rock stations. The music video was directed by Matt Wignall, released in November 2011, and shows a rock concert and archive footage of Kessler.

In February 2012, it reached No. 1 on the Billboard Active Rock chart.

This song is also the theme song of Bryce Kenny's Great Clips Mohawk Warrior Monster Truck that has been held in Monster Jam events since 2017.

Charts

Weekly charts

Year-end charts

Certifications

References

2010 songs
2011 singles
Volbeat songs
Vertigo Records singles
Songs written by Michael Poulsen